Sri Lanka Guardian is  Sri Lankan news website known for its independent  news coverage.It has been banned in Sri Lanka  along with other websites for this criticism of the Sri Lankan government and officials and its investigative journalism. It released a video showing Sri Lankan army female recruits being abused and tortured; the Sri Lankan army accepted the authenticity of the video and ordered an inquiry.

References

External links
 Sri Lanka Guardian Official Website
 Sri Lanka Guardian Alternative Website

Sri Lankan news websites